Frans Karel Leopold Tumbuan (3 August 1939 – 23 March 2015) was an Indonesian actor. He spent part of his childhood in the Netherlands, where he began acting.

He appeared in many Indonesian movies including US-Indonesian productions such as Sam Firstenberg's Blood Warriors  and Guy Norris's Rage and Honor II (both 1993).

Selected filmography
2007 – Dead Time: Kala
2006 – Reality, Love and Rock 'n Roll
2006 – Ekspedisi Madewa
2002 – What's Up with Love?
1997 – Gordel van smaragd
1995 – Without Mercy
1993 – Blood Warriors
1993 – Rage and Honor II
1988 – Jakarta
1988 – Java Burn
1980 – Perempuan dalam pasungan

References

External links

1939 births
2015 deaths
Indonesian Christians
Indonesian male film actors
Minahasa people
Place of birth missing
Place of death missing